This is a list of the largest Europe-based law firms by revenues generated solely in Europe in 2005.
Dentons, >€1,500.00m - (Swiss verein) 
CMS Derks Star Busmann, €1,426.00m - (EU)
Freshfields Bruckhaus Deringer, €1,052.36m - International (UK);
Clifford Chance, €980.14m - International (UK);
Linklaters, €912.64m - International (UK);
Allen & Overy, €843.07m - International (UK);
Lovells, €514.98m - International (UK);
Eversheds Sutherland, €436.57m - International (UK);
Baker McKenzie, €421.57m - International (United States);
DLA Piper, €387.34m - International (UK/USA);
Slaughter & May, €328.99m - London (UK);
Herbert Smith, €322.49m - International (UK);
White & Case, €285.61m - International (USA);
Ashurst, €284.46m - International (UK);
Norton Rose, €262.35m - International (UK);
Uría Menéndez, €252m - International (Spain);
Fidal, €250.00m - French National (France);
CMS Cameron McKenna, €238.03m - International (UK);
Simmons & Simmons, €228.45m - International (UK);
Denton Wilde Sapte, €223.89m - International (UK);
Shearman & Sterling, €221.25m - International (USA);
Hammonds, €199.71m - UK National (UK);
Loyens & Loeff, €189.00m - Rotterdam (Netherlands);
Addleshaw Goddard, €184.53m - UK National (UK);
Garrigues, €172.10m - International (Spain);
Cleary Gottlieb Steen & Hamilton, €160.00m - International (USA);
Hengeler Mueller, €157.85m - German National (Germany);
Berwin Leighton Paisner, €150.33m - London (UK);
SJ Berwin, €146.21m - London (UK);
Mayer Brown, €144.59m - International (USA);
Nauta Dutilh, €140.00m - Amsterdam (Netherlands);
Pinsents, €135.15m - International (UK);
Irwin Mitchell, €134.12m - UK National (UK);
Latham & Watkins, €133.00m - International (USA);
Cuatrecasas, €132.50m - International (Spain);
Weil, Gotshal & Manges, €130.00m - International (USA);
Haarmann Hemmelrath, €130.00m - International (Germany);
Nabarro, €128.67m - London (UK);
Clyde & Co, €123.81m - International (UK);
Jones Day, €122.28m - International (USA);
Skadden, Arps, Slate, Meagher & Flom, €122.00m - International (USA);
Beachcroft, €120.57m - UK National (UK);
Gleiss Lutz, €118.50m - International (Germany);
Wragge & Co, €116.88m - Birmingham (UK);
De Brauw Blackstone Westbroek, €115.00m - International (Netherlands);
EY Law, €114.00m - Paris (France);
CMS Hasche Sigle, €110.00m - German National (Germany);
Barlow Lyde & Gilbert, €109.07m - London (UK);
Gide Loyrette Nouel, €106.14m - International (France);
CMS Bureau Francis Lefebvre, €104.00m - International (France);
Bird & Bird, €101.30m - London (UK);
Macfarlanes, €98.75m - London (UK);
Dechert, €97.81m - International (USA);
Osborne Clarke, €95.21m - UK National (UK);
Salans, €95.07m - International (UK);
Taylor Wessing, €94.33m - International (UK);
Stibbe, €92.60m - Amsterdam (Netherlands);
Gianni, Origoni, Grippo & Partners, €91.38m - Rome (Italy);
Mannheimer Swartling, €90.39m - International (Sweden);
Nörr Stiefenhofer Lutz, €89.90 - International (Germany);
Sullivan & Cromwell, €88.43m - International (USA);
Richards Butler, €88.43m - International (UK);
Olswang, €87.55m - London (UK);
Wessing, €87.25m - German National (Germany);
Lawrence Graham, €86.37m - London (UK);
Vinge, €86.00m - International (Sweden);
Bonelli Erede Pappalardo, €86.00m - Italian National (Italy);
Masons, €85.04m - International (UK);
Houthoff Buruma, €84.00m - Dutch National (Netherlands);
Shoosmiths, €80.48m - UK National (UK);
Landwell & Associés, €80.00m - Paris (France);
Chiomenti Studio Legale, €78.89m - Italian National (Italy);
Stephenson Harwood, €74.14m - London (UK);
McDermott Will & Emery, €70.85m - International (USA);
Reynolds Porter Chamberlain, €69.57m - London (UK);
Field Fisher Waterhouse LLP, €69.27m - London (UK);
Ince & Co, €68.50m - International (UK);
Coudert Brothers, €68.18m - International (USA);
Travers Smith, €66.33m - London (UK);
Sidley Austin, €66.13m - International (USA);
Charles Russell LLP, €65.74m - London (UK);
Kromann Reumert, €65.00m - Copenhagen (Denmark);
Beiten Burkhardt, €65.00m - German National (Germany);
Bech-Bruun Dragsted Dragsted, €65.00m - Copenhagen (Denmark);
Taj, €63.90m - French National (France);
AKD Prinsen van Wijmen, €62.00m - Dutch National (Netherlands);
Cobbetts LLP, €61.61m - UK National (UK);
Holman Fenwick & Willan, €61.17m - International (UK);
McGrigors, €60.43m - Edinburgh (UK);
Hogan & Hartson, €60.43m - International (USA);
Wilmer Hale, €59.55m - International (USA);
Halliwells, €59.55m - Manchester (UK);
Hill Dickinson, €58.96m - Liverpool (UK);
Dundas & Wilson, €58.95m - Edinburgh (UK);
Walker Morris LLP, €58.22m - Leeds (UK);
Dickinson Dees, €58.21m - Newcastle (UK);
Withers, €56.30m - International (UK);
Maclay Murray & Spens, €56.01m - Glasgow (UK);
Watson, Farley & Williams, €54.53m - International (UK);
Bond Pearce, €54.24m - Plymouth (UK);
Saint-Georges Avocats, €53.80m - Paris (France).

See also
List of largest law firms by revenue
List of largest United States-based law firms by profits per partner
List of largest United Kingdom-based law firms by revenue
List of largest Canada-based law firms by revenue
List of largest Japan-based law firms by head count
List of largest China-based law firms by revenue

References